The title Salesian Sisters may refer to one of these Roman Catholic orders for women:

 Salesian Sisters of Don Bosco, also known as Daughters of Mary Help of Christians, founded in 1872
 Order of the Visitation of Holy Mary, also known as Visitationists, founded by in 1610 by Saint Francis de Sales and Saint Jane Frances de Chantal